Cymindis antonowi is a species of ground beetle in the subfamily Harpalinae. It was described by Semenov in 1891.

References

antonowi
Beetles described in 1891